In computability theory, a subset of the natural numbers is called simple if it is computably enumerable (c.e.) and co-infinite (i.e. its complement is infinite), but every infinite subset of its complement is not c.e..  Simple sets are examples of c.e. sets that are not computable.

Relation to Post's problem 
Simple sets were devised by Emil Leon Post in the search for a non-Turing-complete c.e. set.  Whether such sets exist is known as Post's problem.  Post had to prove two things in order to obtain his result: that the simple set A is not computable, and that the K, the halting problem, does not Turing-reduce to A.  He succeeded in the first part (which is obvious by definition), but for the other part, he managed only to prove a many-one reduction.

Post's idea was validated by Friedberg and Muchnik in the 1950s using a novel technique called the priority method.  They give a construction for a set that is simple (and thus non-computable), but fails to compute the halting problem.

Formal definitions and some properties 
In what follows,  denotes a standard uniformly c.e. listing of all the c.e. sets.
A set  is called immune if  is infinite, but for every index , we have .  Or equivalently: there is no infinite subset of  that is c.e..
A set  is called simple if it is c.e. and its complement is immune.
A set  is called effectively immune if  is infinite, but there exists a recursive function  such that for every index , we have that .
A set  is called effectively simple if it is c.e. and its complement is effectively immune.  Every effectively simple set is simple and Turing-complete.
A set  is called hypersimple if it is simple and its complement is hyperimmune.

Notes

References 
 
 
 

Computability theory